Sinclair Thomas (born 26 November 1968) is a former wheelchair basketball player and current coach. He was part of the Great Britain team that came fourth at the 2000 Summer Paralympics and won bronze medals at the 2004 event. He retired from playing in 2007 to become head coach of the Wolverhampton Rhinos, and was assistant coach of Great Britain team that won bronze at the 2008 Paralympics.

References

British men's wheelchair basketball players
Living people
1968 births
Medalists at the 2004 Summer Paralympics
Wheelchair basketball players at the 2004 Summer Paralympics
Paralympic bronze medalists for Great Britain
Paralympic wheelchair basketball players of Great Britain
Paralympic medalists in wheelchair basketball